Albert Alonzo Jones is an American former Negro league pitcher who played in the 1940s.

Jones made his Negro leagues debut in 1944 with the Chicago American Giants, and played for the Memphis Red Sox the following season. In nine recorded career games on the mound, he posted a 4.56 ERA over 53.1 innings.

References

External links
 and Seamheads

Year of birth missing
Place of birth missing
Chicago American Giants players
Memphis Red Sox players